Hajong is an Indo-Aryan language with a possible Tibeto-Burman language substratum. It is spoken by approximately 80,000 ethnic Hajongs across the northeast of the Indian subcontinent, specifically in the states of Assam, Meghalaya, Arunachal Pradesh, and West Bengal in present-day India, and the divisions of Mymensingh and Sylhet in present-day Bangladesh. It is written in Bengali-Assamese script and Latin script. It has many Sanskrit loanwords. The Hajongs originally spoke a Tibeto-Burman language, but it later mixed with Assamese and Bengali.

Old Hajong

The language now spoken by the Hajong people may be considered an Indo-Aryan language, due to language shift from a Tibeto-Burman language. Old Hajong or Khati Hajong may have been related to Garo or Bodo languages, i.e. - of Tibeto-Burman origin. Words in Hajong like /(mother), / (father),  (grandmother),  (grandfather),  (elder brother),  (elder sister),  (younger siblings),  (brother-in-law),  (sister-in-law),  (river),  (colour),  (big),  (to plough),  (soda),  (Spirit or deity),  (Spirit or life),  (parrot), etc. are of Tibeto-Burman origin.

Variations
The Hajong Language varies within the clans because of regional variations. There are five notable clans of the Hajong people.
 Doskinâ'
 Korebari
 Susung'yâ'
 Barohazari'
 Miespe'ryâ'

Writing system
The Hajong language is written using both the Latin and the Bengali scripts. Although both of these scripts are in use in India, the Hajongs in Bangladesh expect to use the Bengali script since most education is in Bengali medium. Although Hajongs living is Dhemaji and surrounding areas use Assamese script. In each script, there is one added unique symbol for the close, back, unrounded vowel /ɯ/.  In Latin script, it is written with "â" or simply a' or e.  In Eastern Nagari script with "" when it is syllable final.

Phonology
Hajong has 23 consonant phonemes, 8 vowel phonemes, and 2 approximants which have some characteristics of consonants namely /w/ and /j/ which act as diphthongs. The vowel phonemes are /a/, /i/, /u/, /e/, /ɛ/, /o/, /ɔ/ and /ɯ/ (close, back, unrounded). Unlike other Indo-Aryan languages, Hajong language has only one 'i' and 'u'. It is somewhat t ambiguous whether the final vowel is a phoneme or an allophone of [a] in the environment of other close vowels. The extra vowel /ɯ/ is not present in other Indo-Aryan languages, but is typical for the Tibeto-Burman family. Codas j and ch in the final position of a syllable turns into an s sound. The phonology of Hajong includes some vowel harmony and the devoicing of final consonants. For separating syllables the apostrophe sign (') or hyphen (-) is used.

Consonant phonemes

Vowel phonemes

Vowels play an important role in changing the meaning of words and the grammatical structure of sentences. Unlike other in most other Indo-Aryan languages like Assamese and Bengali, there is no distinction between longer and shorter /i/ and /u/. The Assamese script lacks some vowels unique to Hajong phonology, which is gradually leading to a vowel shift. And since vowels play an important role in the grammar of this language, the grammatical structure of the language is also changing.

Diphthongs
Hajong phonology has diphthongs which are iotized vowels with j(y) and w. Diphthongs are usually combinations of i or u with other vowel phonemes. Common examples of diphthongs are ya, as in Dyao which is the combined form of i and a; wa, as in khawa which is the combination of u and a; yuh, as in muh'yuh, combination of i and uh, and wuh, as in tuhwuh'''i, combination of u and uh.

Grammar
Hajong language primarily has a canonical word order of Subject–object–verb. A subject–object–verb (SOV) language is one in which the subject, object, and verb of a sentence appear or usually appear in that order. Hajong language has a strong tendency to use postpositions rather than prepositions, to place auxiliary verbs after the action verb, to place genitive noun phrases before the possessed noun and to have subordinators appear at the end of subordinate clauses. Hajong is an agglutinative language. Words are often combined and compressed, often there are no pauses between words until the sentence ends. Even though it is considered an Eastern Indo-Aryan language, Hajong does not conjugate verbs in the same way Bengali or Asamiya do, but rather has a simplified system. The case endings in Hajong are also unique compared to other Indo-Aryan languages and may represent affinity with Tibeto Burman languages. The following table is taken from Phillips:

The genitive and unmarked or accusative cases have two forms; re'/ra and le'/la. For words ending with the vowels /a/, /ɛ/ and /ɔ/ it becomes ra and la and for /i/, /u/, /e/, /o/ and /ɯ/ it becomes re' and le'. The vowels /ɛ/(e) and /ɔ/(o) are used to end interrogative sentences, like 'Bhat khase?'(have you taken your food?) and 'Bhat khabo?'(Do you want to eat?); and the vowels /e/(ei) and /o/(ou) are used at the end of declarative sentences, as in 'Bhat khasei.'([I] have taken my food.) and 'Bhat Khabou'([I] will eat.). Adding the suffix be' or ba to interrogative words turn them into indefinite pronouns; for example, kibe' means something, kei'be' means someone, kumaba means somewhere and also ke'ibe', kageba, kunde'be' and kalaba means 'I don't know who/whom/which/who's' respectively in English. Similarly adding the suffix ha and ga to verbs means 'come and (verb)' and 'go and (verd)' respectively; for example, khaha means come and eat, niha means come and take; khaga means go and eat and niga means go and take.

 Honorifics
A unique feature of Hajong language is the use of honorifics. When talking about someone superior in status, a speaker usually uses special nouns or verb endings to indicate the subject's superiority. Unlike Assamese, Bengali, Sylheti and other Indo-Aryan languages, there is no word like আপুনি/আপনি/আফনে(apuni/apni/afne) to substitute you. Instead, Hajong has a different way to indicate supremacy of the other person. For elders and other higher ranking, people second person and third person pronouns are never used. One always has to refer an elder with their name or their honorary title. Ending words with 'ge' and 'ha' is also a form of showing respect to the other person.

 Example short phrases
Phrases from the Hajong – English Phrase Book'':

Notes

References

 

Hajong culture
Eastern Indo-Aryan languages
Languages of Assam
Languages of Arunachal Pradesh
Languages of Meghalaya
Languages of Bangladesh
Subject–object–verb languages